Elections to Newry and Mourne District Council were held on 5 May 2011 on the same day as the other Northern Irish local government elections. The election used five district electoral areas to elect a total of 30 councillors.

Election results

Note: "Votes" are the first preference votes.

Districts summary

|- class="unsortable" align="centre"
!rowspan=2 align="left"|Ward
! % 
!Cllrs
! % 
!Cllrs
! %
!Cllrs
! %
!Cllrs
! % 
!Cllrs
! % 
!Cllrs
!rowspan=2|TotalCllrs
|- class="unsortable" align="center"
!colspan=2 bgcolor="" | Sinn Féin
!colspan=2 bgcolor="" | SDLP
!colspan=2 bgcolor="" | UUP
!colspan=2 bgcolor="" | UKIP
!colspan=2 bgcolor="" | DUP
!colspan=2 bgcolor="white"| Others
|-
|align="left"|Crotlieve
|38.1
|3
|bgcolor="#99FF66"|46.1
|bgcolor="#99FF66"|4
|7.6
|0
|0.0
|0
|0.0
|0
|8.2
|0
|7
|-
|align="left"|Newry Town
|bgcolor="#008800"|43.8
|bgcolor="#008800"|3
|27.2
|2
|5.6
|0
|0.0
|0
|0.0
|0
|23.4
|2
|7
|-
|align="left"|Slieve Gullion
|bgcolor="#008800"|78.0
|bgcolor="#008800"|4
|22.0
|1
|0.0
|0
|0.0
|0
|0.0
|0
|0.0
|0
|5
|-
|align="left"|The Fews
|bgcolor="#008800"|46.2
|bgcolor="#008800"|2
|23.3
|1
|23.9
|2
|0.0
|0
|4.3
|0
|2.3
|0
|6
|-
|align="left"|The Mournes
|19.5
|1
|20.7
|1
|15.6
|1
|bgcolor="#70147A"|27.7
|bgcolor="#70147A"|1
|12.2
|1
|4.3
|0
|5
|- class="unsortable" class="sortbottom" style="background:#C9C9C9"
|align="left"| Total
|45.2
|14
|28.9
|9
|10.3
|3
|4.8
|1
|3.0
|1
|7.8
|2
|30
|-
|}

Districts results

Crotlieve

2005: 3 x SDLP, 2 x Sinn Féin, 1 x Green, 1 x Independent
2011: 4 x SDLP, 3 x Sinn Féin
2005-2011 Change: SDLP and Sinn Féin gain from Green and Independent

Newry Town

2005: 3 x Sinn Féin, 3 x SDLP, 1 x Independent
2011: 3 x Sinn Féin, 2 x SDLP, 2 x Independent
2005-2011 Change: Independent gain from SDLP

Slieve Gullion

2005: 4 x Sinn Féin, 1 x SDLP
2011: 4 x Sinn Féin, 1 x SDLP
2005-2011 Change: No change

The Fews

2005: 3 x Sinn Féin, 1 x UUP, 1 x SDLP, 1 x DUP
2011: 3 x Sinn Féin, 2 x UUP, 1 x SDLP
2005-2011 Change: UUP gain from DUP

The Mournes

2005: 2 x UUP, 1 x DUP, 1 x SDLP, 1 x Sinn Féin
2011: 1 x UKIP, x UUP, 1 x DUP, 1 x SDLP, 1 x Sinn Féin
2005-2011 Change: UKIP gain from UUP

References

Newry and Mourne District Council elections
Newry and Mourne